Mirosław Ferić (17 June 1915 – 14 February 1942), was a Polish-Croatian fighter pilot, a flying ace of World War II.

Early life 
Ferić was born in Travnik in Bosnia and Herzegovina, his father was a Bosnian Croat (who died during World War I) and his mother was a Pole. In 1919 his family moved to Poland. He graduated in 1938 from the Polish Air Force Academy in Dęblin as a fighter pilot, and served with fighter escadre No. 111 with a rank of podporucznik pilot (2nd Lt. pilot).

War service 
During the Invasion of Poland in 1939, he served with Escadre No. 111, assigned to the Pursuit Brigade (Brygada Poscigowa) and defending the Warsaw area. On 3 September his PZL P.11c fighter was damaged in combat but he successfully bailed out. During the campaign he shot down a Hs 126 on 8 September as a 'shared' victory (other sources also credit him with a Bf 110 shared with others, but this victory was not officially credited).

On 17 September he and other pilots were ordered to evacuate to Romania. There he was interned, but escaped and travelled to France by sea. After training on French aircraft, he was assigned to a flight commanded by Kazimierz Kuzian flying Morane MS-406 fighters  protecting aircraft works around Nantes. However, Ferić saw no air combat. After the fall of France, Ferić evacuated in June 1940 to Great Britain.

After advanced training at an RAF OTU he was assigned to the newly formed Polish No. 303 Polish Fighter Squadron, based at RAF Northolt flying Hawker Hurricanes and entering service in the Battle of Britain on 31 August 1940. On his first day of combat he shot down a Messerschmitt Bf 109. On 2 September he probably shot down another one, but his plane was damaged and he made a forced landing. On 6 September he shot down another Bf 109, and on 15 September a Bf 109 and Bf 110. On 27 September he shot down a Bf 109 and a Heinkel He 111, and on 5 October a Bf 109.

After an operational break the squadron was back in combat in January 1941, flying Supermarine Spitfires on missions over France. On 22 June during a bomber escort he shot down a Bf 109, and on 27 June damaged another. In October he was sent to a six-month rest tour to an Operational Training Unit as an instructor, but after three months he volunteered to return to a combat posting.

Ferić returned to No. 303 Squadron in January 1942. He is buried in Northwood Cemetery.

Mirosław Ferić was the 11th ranked Polish fighter ace with 8 and 2/3 confirmed kills and 1 probable kill. From September 1939 he had kept a personal diary, which became No.303 Squadron's unit history.

Honours and awards 
 Virtuti Militari, Silver Cross (18 September 1940)
 Cross of Valour, twice
 Distinguished Flying Cross (United Kingdom) (15 December 1940)

References

Bibliography
 Bristow, Mark. (2005) A History of Royal Air Force Northolt. RAF Northolt: No. 1 AIDU
 Wacław Król: Myśliwcy. Warszawa: Ministerstwo Obrony Narodowej, 1980, pp. 230–256. .
 Richard King: Dywizjon 303 walka i codzienność. Warszawa: Wydawnictwo RM, 2012, p. 39. .
 Tadeusz Jerzy Krzystek, Anna Krzystek: Polskie Siły Powietrzne w Wielkiej Brytanii w latach 1940-1947 łącznie z Pomocniczą Lotniczą Służbą Kobiet (PLSK-WAAF). Sandomierz: Stratus, 2012, p. 176. 
 Jerzy Pawlak: Polskie eskadry w Wojnie Obronnej 1939. Warszawa: Wydawnictwa Komunikacji i Łączności, 1991 
 Jerzy Pawlak: Absolwenci Szkoły Orląt: 1925-1939. Warszawa: Retro-Art, 2009, p. 177. 
 Piotr Sikora: Asy polskiego lotnictwa. Warszawa: Oficyna Wydawnicza Alma-Press. 2014, p. 213-217. 
 Józef Zieliński: Asy polskiego lotnictwa. Warszawa: Agencja lotnicza ALTAIR, 1994, p. 38. ISBN 83862172. 
 Józef Zieliński: Lotnicy polscy w Bitwie o Wielką Brytanię. Warszawa: Oficyna Wydawnicza MH, 2005, pp. 46–47. 
 Józef Zieliński: 303 Dywizjon Myśliwski Warszawski im. Tadeusza Kościuszki. Warszawa: Bellona, 2003

External links 

1915 births
1942 deaths
People from Travnik
Aviators killed in aviation accidents or incidents in England
Polish World War II flying aces
Polish Royal Air Force pilots of World War II
Royal Air Force personnel killed in World War II
The Few
Recipients of the Distinguished Flying Cross (United Kingdom)
Recipients of the Silver Cross of the Virtuti Militari
Recipients of the Cross of Valour (Poland)
Polish people of Croatian descent
Polish people of Bosnia and Herzegovina descent
Bosnia and Herzegovina people of Croatian descent
Bosnia and Herzegovina people of Polish descent
Victims of aviation accidents or incidents in 1942